Hafizullah Wali Rahimi served as President of the Afghanistan National Olympic Committee from April 2018 to September 2021. He is of Tajik ethnicity. Rahimi is also a member of the Peace Through Sport Committee.

Career 
On 5 April 2018, at the NOC's third Extraordinary General Assembly (EGA) in Kabul, Rahimi was elected to become the committee's President for four terms via election. The elections were supervised by IOC representatives from the Olympic Council of Asia (OCA), including the continental body's Asian Games Head of Department, Haider Farman. Rahimi succeeded Mohammad Zahir Aghbar as President of the committee.

The President is accompanied by CEO Dad Mohammad Paida Akhtari, secretary general Mohammad Yonus Popalzay, Vice Presidents Bawar Hotak and Mohammad Hashim Karimi, and Vice President for the women's division, Robina Jalali.

In 2020, Rahimi signed an agreement with four national sports federations to secure Olympic Solidarity funding for the 2020 Summer Olympics.

See also 
 Afghanistan National Olympic Committee
 Afghanistan at the Olympics
 Afghanistan at the Paralympics
 Afghanistan at the Asian Games
 Sports in Afghanistan

References 

Year of birth missing (living people)
Living people
Afghan sports executives and administrators
Afghan Tajik people
National Olympic Committees